Jimmy Mulkerrin (25 December 1931 – May 2015) was a Scottish footballer who played for Hibernian, Accrington Stanley, Tranmere Rovers and Northwich Victoria. Mulkerrin signed for Hibernian in 1950 and made sporadic appearances in seven years with the club, as he mainly substituted for their regular centre forward Lawrie Reilly. He played for Scotland B once, in a 2–2 draw with England B on 29 February 1956.

References

1931 births
2015 deaths
Sportspeople from Dumbarton
Footballers from West Dunbartonshire
Scottish footballers
Association football forwards
Hibernian F.C. players
Accrington Stanley F.C. (1891) players
Tranmere Rovers F.C. players
Northwich Victoria F.C. players
Scottish Football League players
English Football League players
Scotland B international footballers